Iğdır is a village in Mersin Province, Turkey. It is a part of Akdeniz district which itself is a part of Greater Mersin. The population of the village was 1,243 as of 2012.

References

Villages in Akdeniz District